Midleton RFC is an Irish rugby union club that plays in Division 2C of the All-Ireland League.

History
The club was founded in the 1927/28 season, but disbanded in 1934. Midleton RFC was reformed on 4 March 1967.

After a number of decades in the junior leagues, Midleton attained senior status after the 1997/1998 campaign with a 30-7 playoff victory over Sligo RFC. Midleton were beaten finalists in the Munster Senior Cup in 2003. As of 2010, the club was playing in Division Three. By 2020, the club was playing in Division 2C of the All-Ireland League.

There was a revamp of club facilities in the mid-2000s.

Club honours
 Munster Junior Cup (2) 1997, 1998
Cork Charity Cup (3) 1999, 2003, 2006
Cork Charity Shield (4) 2018, 2019, 2020, 2022 
Munster Junior Clubs' Challenge Cup (1) 1997
Munster Junior League Division 1 (2) 1996-97, 1997-98
Munster Junior League Division 2 (1) 1994

Notable players
Former All Black fullback Christian Cullen made a 20 minute appearance for Midleton in a friendly match against Cork Constitution in March 2006. Other former players have included:

 Jason Holland
 Junior Sifa
 Christy Condon
 John O'Neill
 Diarmuid O'Sullivan
 Mark Donnelly

References

External links
Midleton RFC

Irish rugby union teams
Midleton
Rugby union clubs in County Cork
Rugby clubs established in 1927
Senior Irish rugby clubs (Munster)
1927 establishments in Ireland